Government Tibbi College and Hospital, Patna, established in 1926, is an Unani medical college situated in Patna, Bihar, India.

About college
It is the first government Unani college in India. The college imparts the degree Bachelor of Unani Medicine and Surgery (BUMS). It also offers a one-year course of pre-tib. The college is affiliated to Aryabhatta Knowledge University and is recognised by Medical Council of India.This college is quite famous in Bihar for taking extremely late exam and results.Academic session here is very prolonged.

See also

References

External links 

Aryabhatta Knowledge University

1926 establishments in India
Colleges affiliated to Aryabhatta Knowledge University
Educational institutions established in 1926
Medical colleges in Bihar